The discography of American indie rock band Vampire Weekend consists of four studio albums, two extended plays, fifteen singles, and ten music videos.

Studio albums

Extended plays

Singles

Other charted and certified songs

Music videos

Notes

References

External links
 
 
 

Rock music group discographies
Discographies of American artists